

Governance

Arpookara is administered by Indian village governance system called Grama Panchayat.

Location

Arpookara is in Kerala. This village is home to the Government Medical College, Kottayam.

Etymology

The meaning of Arpookara relates to a place where sports are played. Its proximity to the Vembanad Lake and Kumarakom makes Arpookara one of the main tourist attractions in Kerala.

References

Villages in Kottayam district